Keenan Brock (born January 6, 1992) is an American sprinter who specializes in the 100 and 200 metres.

Brock ran for George Washington Carver High School in Birmingham, Alabama, where he won the Alabama State Championships twice at 100 and 200 and once in the triple jump.   His time in the 100 his senior year was the state record 10.37.  Between his junior and senior years, he won an individual bronze medal in the 200 metres and was on the winning American team in the Medley Relay at the 2009 World Youth Championships in Athletics in Brixen.

Next he went to the University of Auburn.  He ran for the USA at the 2011 Pan American Junior Athletics Championships taking an individual silver medal in the 100 metres and being part of the American gold medal winning 4x100 metres relay.  The following year he again was on the American squad at the 2012 NACAC Under-23 Championships in Athletics, taking the same combination of 100 metres silver and anchoring the 4x100.  His 10.09 personal record that year got him into the 2012 United States Olympic Trials.

References

External links

DyeStat profile for Keenan Brock

1992 births
Living people
American male sprinters
Track and field athletes from Birmingham, Alabama
African-American male track and field athletes
Auburn Tigers men's track and field athletes
21st-century African-American sportspeople